Ana Cepinska Miszczak (born 11 April 1978) is a Venezuelan model and Miss World Venezuela 1996 who won the Miss World Photogenic award and placed fourth runner-up to Miss World 1996.

Miss World Venezuela

Miss World 1996
As the official representative of her country to the 1996 Miss World pageant held in Bangalore, India on November 23, 1996, she won the Photogenic award and placed fourth runner-up to eventual winner Irene Skliva of Greece.

Life after Miss World
She has lived in Mexico since 2004 to work in television, and became the first full-nude model of Playboy Mexico in April 2007.

References

External links
 Portfolio
 Photo for Miss World (Archived 2009-10-25)
 Playboy edition
 Yahoo! News

1978 births
Living people
Miss World 1996 delegates
Venezuelan people of Polish descent
Venezuelan female models